Charles Sumner Slichter (April 16, 1864 – October 4, 1946) was an applied mathematician and dean of the graduate school at the University of Wisconsin-Madison. His most notable scholarly contribution focused on hydrogeology, where he developed a method of quantifying the velocity of ground-water underflow in river valleys.  This method employed ammonium chloride that would be placed in an upstream, i.e., the upgradient, well and detected in three observation wells a short distance away, i.e., the downgradient.

Family
Slichter was the husband of Mary Byrne Slichter and was the father of economist Sumner Slichter, geophysicist Louis B. Slichter, industrialist Allen Slichter, and businessman Donald Slichter, the grandfather of physicist Charles Pence Slichter, and the great-grandfather of musician Jacob Slichter.

Books
Galileo, 1642-1942: an essay commemorating the tercentenary of Galileo: read before a joint meeting of the Wisconsin Chapter of Sigma Xi and the Dept. of Mathematics on November 17, 1942  
Science in a Tavern: Essays and Diversions on Science in the Making, University of Wisconsin Press, 1938
Four-place logarithmic tables for rapid computation arranged by Charles S. Slichter, New York: Macmillan & Co. (1906)
The tidal and other problems (1909)
Elementary mathematical analysis, a text book for first year college students (1914)
Observations on the ground waters of Rio Grande Valley (1905)
Field measurements of the rate of movement of underground waters (1905)
The motions of underground waters (1902)
The underflow in Arkansas Valley in western Kansas (1906)
The underflow of the South Platte valley (1906)
Theoretical investigation of the motion of ground waters (1899)

References

External links

Hydrogeologists
1864 births
1946 deaths
University of Wisconsin–Madison faculty